Greatest Hits Radio West Yorkshire (previously Magic 828 and Radio Aire 2) is a local radio station serving West Yorkshire on 96.3 FM, DAB, Online and App.

History

Magic 828 
Magic 828 was launched by Roger Kirk at 8:28 am on 17 July 1990. The station was formed due to Radio Aire splitting its AM and FM frequencies, with Radio Aire rebranding as Aire FM. The station broadcast on 828 kHz AM and the first song played was "Magical Mystery Tour" by The Beatles.

The 'Magic 828' name was created by Bob Preedy who was a presenter on Radio Aire at the time.

Its first jingle package was produced by Century 21 and the voice-overs were voiced by John Myers.

The programmes between 6 am and 1 am were broadcast live from Studio 2 in Radio Aire's Burley Road studio complex in Leeds.  The original weekday line-up was Roger Kirk (6am-9.30am), Ray Stroud (9.30am-1pm), The Magic Mix (1pm-2pm), Peter Tait (2pm-6pm), Nothing But The 60's (6pm-7pm), Mike Vitti (7pm-10pm), Alex Hall (10pm-1am) and The Superstation (1am-6am).  A few months after Magic 828's launch, The Superstation closed, Andy Siddell took over evenings and Mike Vitti presented the new overnight programme, Nightflight.  The Nightflight programme was simulcast on Aire FM & Magic 828 and broadcast between 1 am & 6 am from Studio 1 (the studio used for Aire FM).  Local news during the early 1990s was also simulcast on both stations, although Aire FM only took the first two minutes of the four-minute bulletin.

After Emap bought Radio Aire and Magic 828 in 1995, they began to roll the Magic brand out across the other AM stations in they owned, creating Magic 1161 (Hull), Magic 990, 1305 & 1548 (Sheffield), Magic 1152 (Newcastle), Magic 1170 (Teesside), Magic 999 (Preston), Magic 1548 (Liverpool) and Magic 1152 (Manchester).

In December 2001, EMAP decided that it was more economical for the Magic network to share off-peak programmes and in line with the other Magic AM stations began networking between 10 am-2 pm, and 7 pm-6 am. During these hours it was simply known as Magic, although there were local commercial breaks and local news on the hour.

In January 2003 after a sharp decline in listening, the station ceased networking with the London station Magic 105.4. At this point, a regional northern network was created with programmes broadcast from Magic 1152 in Newcastle. During networked hours, local adverts were aired, as well as local news on the hour.

In July 2006, more networking was introduced across the Northern Magic AM network with only the 4-hour breakfast show between 06:00 and 10:00 presented from the local studios. However, the decision was taken in April 2013 to network this show across the other Yorkshire-based Magic stations. Other programming was networked from Newcastle, Manchester and London.

Radio Aire 2 
Following the rebrand of the Magic AM stations in northern England at the start of 2015, the station became known as Radio Aire 2 and then Greatest Hits Radio from January 2019.

Greatest Hits Radio 
Greatest Hits Radio West Yorkshire was formed on 7 January 2019.  It later moved to FM to replace Radio Aire, and the Leeds medium wave transmitter was switched off.

References

External links 
Magic 828 Archive The History of Magic 828

Bauer Radio
Radio stations in Yorkshire
Radio stations established in 1990